Eaton School or Eaton Elementary School may refer to:

in Canada
 Lady Eaton Elementary School, Omemee, Ontario, named for Flora Eaton
Eaton Hall, once part of Seneca College and now a public hotel, named for Flora Eaton
Lady Eaton College at Trent University, Peterborough, Ontario, named for Flora Eaton
Cyrus Eaton Elementary School, Pugwash, Nova Scotia, a school within the Chignecto-Central Regional School Board, in Cumberland County, Nova Scotia, named after Cyrus S. Eaton
Eaton's Building (Saskatoon), Saskatchewan, offices of Saskatoon Board of Education

in England
The Long Eaton School, also or previously known as Long Eaton Higher Elementary School, Derbyshire, England

in the United States
(by state then city or town)
Eaton Elementary School, Fresno, California, a school in the Fresno Unified School District
Eaton Academy, a private school in Roswell, Georgia
Eaton Park Elementary School, in Abbeville, Louisiana, in the Vermilion Parish School Board
Eaton School (Norridgewock, Maine), NRHP-listed
Joshua Eaton Elementary School, in Reading, Massachusetts, one of the Reading Public Schools, located near historic homestead of Joshua Eaton
Eaton Intermediate School District, Michigan, which covers parts of Eaton County and other counties
Eaton Elementary School (Hattiesburg, Mississippi), listed on the National Register of Historic Places (NRHP) in Forrest County, Mississippi
Morrisville-Eaton Junior/Senior High School, Morrisville, New York, within Morrisville-Eaton Central School District
Eaton Community Schools, of Eaton, Ohio, including
 Eaton Middle School, Eaton, Ohio
 Eaton High School (Ohio), Eaton, Ohio
 Eaton Elementary School (Lenoir City, Tennessee), in Lenoir City, Tennessee
Eaton School, a middle school feeding Phoebus High School, Hampton, Virginia
Syms-Eaton Academy, America's first free public school, established in Hampton, Virginia in 1634
Syms-Eaton Elementary School, a former school, now a pavilion in downtown Hampton, Virginia
 Hampton High School (Hampton, Virginia), a public secondary school that is arguably a successor to the Syms-Eaton Academy
Eaton Fundamental Middle School, a feeder to Bethel High School (Hampton, Virginia)
John Eaton Elementary School, Washington, D.C., in the District of Columbia Public Schools, which Philip K. Dick attended

See also
Eaton House (disambiguation)